Educational Services of America (ESA) is an alternative school management company. Its divisions include Ombudsman Educational Services, EAP (Early Autism Project) and Spectrum Center. It is based in Nashville, Tennessee. The company partners with school districts It was founded in 1999 and is based in Knoxville, Tennessee. Mark Claypool is the company's president and Chief Executive Officer.

References

Education companies of the United States
Companies based in Knoxville, Tennessee
Education companies established in 1999
1999 establishments in Tennessee